"Love's the Answer" is a song written by Emily Mitchell and Norro Wilson, and recorded by American country music artist Tanya Tucker.  It was released in October 1972 as the second single from her album Delta Dawn.  The song peaked at number 5 on the Billboard Hot Country Singles chart. It also reached number 1 on the RPM Country Tracks chart in Canada.

Chart performance

References

1972 singles
1972 songs
Tanya Tucker songs
Songs written by Norro Wilson
Song recordings produced by Billy Sherrill
Columbia Records singles